Milcho Milev (born 11 September 1941) is a Bulgarian volleyball player. He competed in the men's tournament at the 1968 Summer Olympics.

References

External links
 

1941 births
Living people
Bulgarian men's volleyball players
Olympic volleyball players of Bulgaria
Volleyball players at the 1968 Summer Olympics
People from Haskovo
Sportspeople from Haskovo Province